Cape Bryant is on the northern coast of Greenland, marking the northeastern extent of the Robeson Channel where it joins the Lincoln Sea in the Arctic Ocean, at .

See also
 Greenland

Bryant